The 200 quota places for equestrian at the 2020 Summer Olympics were divided between the three disciplines (75 for jumping, 65 for eventing, and 60 for dressage).  Teams in each discipline consisted of three horse and rider pairs; any NOC that qualified a team (20 teams for jumping, 15 each for eventing and dressage) also received 3 entries in the individual competition for that discipline. NOCs that did not qualify teams could earn one individual place in dressage and jumping, and up to two individual places in eventing, for a total of 15 entries in jumping and dressage and 20 for eventing. Teams qualify primarily through specific competitions (World Equestrian Games and continental tournaments), while individuals qualify through rankings. The host nation, Japan, automatically qualified a team in each discipline.

Timeline
The following is a timeline of the qualification events for the equestrian events at the 2020 Summer Olympics.

Qualification summary

Dressage

Team

Individual 

 – Brazil and South Africa initially qualified a team, but failed to provide the NOC Certificate of Capability by December 31, 2019. As a result, their team quotas got reallocated to Composite teams, while Brazil and South Africa received one individual spot each from the respective regional groups.
 – Ireland withdrew their team spot, which got reallocated to Belgium.
 – Norway, Belarus and New Zealand withdrew their individual spots, which got reallocated to Italy, Estonia and Singapore, respectively.
 – Bermuda failed to confirm the minimum eligibility requirements (MER). Their quota place got reallocated to Chile.

Eventing

Team

Individual 

 – Chile and Pakistan failed to confirm the minimum eligibility requirements (MER). Their quota places got reallocated to Ecuador and Austria, respectively.

Jumping

Team

Individual 

 – Ukraine initially qualified a team, but failed to provide the NOC Certificate of Capability by December 31, 2019. As a result, their team quota got reallocated to Czech Republic, while Ukraine received an individual spot from the respective regional group.
 – Canada and Qatar were disqualified from the respective qualifiers due to positive doping cases.

References

Equestrian at the 2020 Summer Olympics
Qualification for the 2020 Summer Olympics